Transportation in Washington may refer to:

 Transportation in Washington (state)
 Transportation in Washington, D.C.